Antonio Codronchi (5 August 1746, Imola - 22 January 1826, Ravenna) was an Italian priest and archbishop.

Life
He served as papal nuncio to Turin from 1778 until he was made archbishop of Ravenna on 8 May 1785. He pushed for the Peace of Tolentino in 1797 and played a role in the Consulte de Lyon in 1802. When Napoleon I made himself king of Italy, he made Codronchi grand-almoner, senator and grand-dignitary of the Order of the Iron Crown. After Napoleon's fall, he backed the Bourbons.

Bibliography
Giuseppe Pignatelli, Dizionario Biografico degli Italian, vol. 26, 1982, p. CODRONCHI, Antonio

Archbishops of Ravenna
1746 births
1826 deaths